Miculescu is a Romanian surname. Notable people with the surname include:

 Constantin Miculescu, physicist
 Ninel Miculescu, Romanian weightlifter
 Valentin Miculescu, Romanian footballer
 Simona Miculescu, Romanian diplomat

Romanian-language surnames